Suvobor (Serbian Cyrillic: Сувобор) is a mountain in central Serbia, near the town of Gornji Milanovac.

The northwestern part of Suvobor is called Rajac (847 m ) and is generally developed the best for tourism.

History
Suvobor and Rajac were the site of Battle of Kolubara of the World War I in December 1914. In World War II, Suvobor was a stronghold of Chetnik movement, and their leader Draža Mihailović had the main headquarters at Ravna Gora. After World War II forest rangers planted conifer trees on the naturally bare summit of the mountain.

Fauna and Flora
The valleys around Suvobor are covered with young oak forests, its slopes on the other hand are covered with conifer trees. On the slopes of the mountain different animal species can be found like roe deer, hare and pheasant.
Vrujci spa is located on the northern slopes of Suvobor.

References

Mountains of Serbia
Šumadija
Rhodope mountain range